The Basel Paper Mill (German: Basler Papiermühle), also known as the Swiss Museum for Paper, Writing and Printing (German: Schweizerisches Museum für Papier, Schrift und Druck) in Basel, is primarily dedicated to papermaking, the art of book printing and writing in general. Through a combination of pictures and objects, visitors gain insights into the old artisanal techniques of dipping paper, printing and bookbinding.

The museum is located in a carefully restored building that began its life as a paper mill 500 years ago. It is a heritage site of national significance.

Footnotes

See also 
Museums in Basel

External links 

 Basel Paper Mill website

Museums in Basel
Technology museums in Switzerland
Book arts
Cultural property of national significance in Basel-Stadt
Historic house museums in Switzerland
Papermaking in Switzerland
Printing press museums
Literary museums in Switzerland
Papermaking museums